Lennart Olsson, born 1961, is a Swedish zoologist and embryologist, professor of comparative zoology at the Friedrich Schiller University of Jena, Germany.

Olsson focuses his research primarily on the embryological development of the vertebrate head. He is also a major contributor to the history of ideas in comparative anatomy.

Olsson edits the journal Acta Zoologica together with Graham Budd.

References 

1961 births
Living people
Swedish anatomists
Developmental biologists
Swedish zoologists
Herpetologists
Swedish ichthyologists
Uppsala University alumni
Academic staff of the University of Jena